Bulgakovo is a rural locality (a selo) in Ufimsky District of the Republic of Bashkortostan, Russia, located  north of Ufa, the capital of the republic. Population: 

It was founded in 1785 as a seltso.

References

Rural localities in Ufimsky District
Ufa Governorate